Powerhouse is the seventh album by the Christian rock band White Heart and the first with Brian Wooten on guitars, Anthony Sallee on bass guitar and the first album on the Star Song label, and the band's only album with Mark Nemer on drums.  It was released in late 1990. White Heart continues their arena rock sound from their previous album Freedom with the title song and "Independence Day" becoming hits on  Christian Rock radio while their ballads like "Desert Rose" and "Lay It Down" were hits on Christian radio (AC/CHR) stations. Powerhouse peaked at number 4 on the Billboard Top Christian Albums chart.

White Heart also released a 25-minute video on VHS called Live at the Power House featuring concert footage, music videos for "Independence Day" and "Desert Rose" and interviews.

Track listing
 "Independence Day" (Smiley, Gersmehl, Florian) – 5:37 
 "Powerhouse" (Sallee, Smiley, Wooten, Gersmehl, Nemer) – 4:30
 "Desert Rose" (Smiley, Gersmehl, Florian) – 4:41	
 "Lovers and Dreamers" (Smiley, Gersmehl, Florian, Tommy Sims) – 4:35
 "Nailed Down" (Smiley, Wooten, Gersmehl, Dale Oliver) – 5:09
 "Messiah" (Gersmehl) – 5:19
 "A Love Calling" (Smiley, Gersmehl, Nemer) – 6:24
 "Answer the Call" (Smiley, Gersmehl) – 4:44 
 "Storyline" (Smiley, Gersmehl) – 4:20
 "Lay It Down" (Smiley, Gersmehl) – 4:57

Personnel 

White Heart
 Rick Florian – lead vocals, backing vocals
 Mark Gersmehl – keyboards, lead vocals, backing vocals
 Billy Smiley – acoustic and rhythm guitars, backing vocals
 Brian Wooten – lead and rhythm guitars
 Anthony Sallee – bass 
 Mark Nemer – drums and percussion

Additional musicians
 Carl Marsh – Fairlight percussion
 Gordon Kennedy – backing vocals
 Chris Rodriguez – backing vocals
 Marty McCall – backing vocals

Production 

 Darrell A. Harris – executive producer
 Bill Drescher – producer, engineer, mixing
 Mark Gersmehl – co-producer
 Billy Smiley – co-producer
 Barry Dixon – assistant engineer
 Richard Engstrom – assistant engineer
 Roy Gamble – assistant engineer
 Lee Groitzsch – assistant engineer
 Shawn McLean – assistant engineer
 Malcolm Greenwood – project coordinator, management
 Toni Thigpen – art direction
 Tufts Design Studio – design and layout
 Bob Forti – cover photography
 Mark Tucker – back cover photography
 The Bennett House, Franklin, Tennessee – recording location
 Quad Studios, Nashville, Tennessee – recording location
 Midtown Tone & Volume, Nashville, Tennessee – recording location
 Studio 55, Los Angeles, California – mixing location

Charts

Radio singles

References

1990 albums
White Heart albums